Moving On is a 2022 American comedy film written and directed by Paul Weitz. The film stars Jane Fonda, Lily Tomlin, Malcolm McDowell, Richard Roundtree, and Catherine Dent.

The film premiered at the 2022 Toronto International Film Festival on September 13, 2022.

In December 2022, it was announced that Roadside Attractions acquired North American rights to the film, which was released on March 17, 2023.

Plot
Two estranged former friends reconnect at the funeral of another mutual friend, and decide to exact revenge on their dead friend's widower for wronging them decades earlier.

Cast
Jane Fonda as Claire
Lily Tomlin as Evelyn
Malcolm McDowell as Howard
Richard Roundtree as Ralph
Catherine Dent as Molly

References

External links
 

2022 films
2022 comedy films
2020s American films
2020s English-language films
2020s female buddy films
American comedy films
American films about revenge
Films directed by Paul Weitz
Films with screenplays by Paul Weitz